Kawai Musical Instruments is a Japanese musical instrument manufacturing company.

Kawai may also refer to:

Places
Kawai, Gifu, a former village in Japan now part of Hida, Gifu
Kawai, Iwate, a former village in Japan
Kawai, Nara, a town in Nara Prefecture, Japan
Kawai, Myanmar, a village in Hkamti Township, in the Sagaing Region
Kawai Station (Ibaraki), a railway station on the Suigun Line operated by East Japan Railway Company
Kawai Station (Tokyo), a railway station in Tokyo operated by the East Japan Railway Company
Kawai Point, a jutting headland on the island of Kauai in the Hawaiian Islands
Kawai, Rajasthan, a town in Rajasthan, India

People
Kawai (name), a Japanese surname and feminine given name, including notable people with the name

See also
Kawaii, Japanese word for "cute"
Kawhi Leonard, American professional basketball player
Kauai, one of the Hawaiian Islands